Pierre Charles Bouvier  (born May 9, 1979) is a Canadian singer and musician best known for being the lead vocalist and studio bassist of the rock band Simple Plan.

Personal life 
Bouvier was born to Réal and Louise Bouvier. He has two older brothers, Jay and Jonathan. He attended Collège Beaubois in Pierrefonds, Quebec, with bandmates Chuck Comeau, Jeff Stinco, and Sébastien Lefebvre. Before and partly during his early musical career, Bouvier worked as a cook at St-Hubert in Montréal. Bouvier has two daughters, and has been married to Lachelle Farrar since 2013.

Career 
When Bouvier was 13 or 14 years old, he founded the punk rock band Reset with his best friend Chuck Comeau in which he was the bass guitarist and lead vocalist. He was not happy with Reset and left the band in 1999, a year after Comeau's departure in 1998. His former bandmate David Desrosiers took his place as lead vocalist and bass guitarist. He later met Comeau at a Sugar Ray concert and joined him in creating Simple Plan with old schoolmates Desrosiers, Jeff Stinco, and Sébastien Lefebvre.

He hosted the MTV reality show Damage Control.

Instruments 
Bouvier is best known for owning a collection of Takamine acoustic guitars which he uses on every album and while playing live. He also owns a few of Fender electric guitars. Since 2020, he also multitasks as bass guitarist and lead singer following departure of David Desrosiers.

Filmography

Discography

With Reset 
 Concerned (Demo, 1995)
 No Worries (1997)
 No Limits (1999)

With Simple Plan 

 No Pads, No Helmets...Just Balls (2002)
 Still Not Getting Any... (2004)
 Simple Plan (2008)
 Get Your Heart On! (2011)
 Taking One for the Team (2016)
 Harder Than It Looks (2022)

Collaborations and appearances 
 "It's Not Easy (Being Green)" – MC Lars
 "Wavin' Flag" – K'naan
 "True Colors" – Artists Against
 "Too Little, Too Late" – Faber Drive (2013)
 "December" – MxPx
 "Take What You Give" – Silverstein (2020)
"NICOTINA" – GionnyScandal (2021)
"I Hate Everybody" – Chad Tepper (2021)
"my ex" – Chad Tepper (2022)

References

External links 

 
 

1979 births
Living people
20th-century Canadian bass guitarists
20th-century Canadian male singers
21st-century Canadian bass guitarists
21st-century Canadian male singers
Alternative rock guitarists
Alternative rock singers
Atlantic Records artists
Canadian alternative rock musicians
Canadian male guitarists
Canadian male voice actors
Canadian punk rock guitarists
Canadian punk rock singers
Canadian rock singers
French Quebecers
Lava Records artists
Male actors from Montreal
Male bass guitarists
People from L'Île-Bizard–Sainte-Geneviève
Pop punk singers
Reset (Canadian band) members
Simple Plan members
Singers from Montreal